Abdur Rahman Boyati (1 January 1939 – 19 August 2013) was a Bangladeshi folk singer. He was also a lyricist, music composer, director and poet. He was awarded Ekushey Padak in 2015 by the Government of Bangladesh. He is most notable for the hits "Mon Amar Deho Ghori Sondhan Kori”, "Ei Prithibi Jemon Ache, Temni Pore Robe" and "Din Gele Ar Din Pabi Na".

Career
Boyati started to sing professionally in 1956. In 1982 he formed a group named Abdur Rahman’s Group.

He was also an actor. He acted in Ashati, directed by Hafiz Uddin, in 1989.

Honors and awards
Boyati was awarded Ekushey Padak in 2015. He was invited to a cultural show at the dinner party of George Bush Sr. held in the White House in 1990. For his contribution to the music of Bangladesh, Boyati won six national awards in total.

References

2013 deaths
Bangladeshi male musicians
Recipients of the Ekushey Padak
People from Dhaka
Bangladeshi male film actors
1939 births